Brechbühl or Brechbuhl is a surname. Notable people with the surname include:

 (born 1939), Swiss journalist, translator, and publisher
Ulrich Brechbuhl (born 1964), Swiss-American businessman and government official
Urs Brechbühl (born 1946), Swiss biathlete